Jazz-Iz-Christ is the debut studio album by Jazz-iz Christ, a group fronted by Armenian-American singer Serj Tankian. The album was released on July 23, 2013, by Serjical Strike Records.

The album has essential participation of the renowned pianist Tigran Hamasyan, flautist Valeri Tolstov, and trumpet player Tom Duprey. It also features additional performances from Stewart Copeland and actor/musician David Alpay and Vincent Pedulla. Unlike much of Tankian's previous discography, only 4 of the 15 tracks features Serj's vocals ("Distant Thing", "Song of Sand", "Garuna", and "Miso Soup"). All the other tracks are instrumental, except for "End of Time", which features a female vocalist.

According to Tankian, Jazz-Iz-Christ is "a combination. There's some classic jazz, dance-y stuff, and progressive things. It's all over the place, but it's jazz instrument-wise. It's for a modern listener who appreciates jazz overtones."

Track listing

Personnel 

 Serj Tankian - vocals (on 7-9, 15), bass guitar (on 1-6, 10-12, 14), piano (on 2-3, 6, 14) electric guitar (on 11), acoustic guitar (on 15), sitar (on 3), synth (on 2-5, 12, 15), programming (on 1-6, 10-12, 14, 15), samples (on 1-6, 10-12, 14).
 Tigran Hamasyan - electric piano Rhodes (on 5, 12, 13), keyboards (on 1), piano (on 1, 5, 7, 9, 12, 13), bass synth (on 12, 13).
 Tom Duprey - flugelhorn (on 1, 4, 5, 7, 8, 15), trumpet (on 2-3, 6, 11-15), piccolo trumpet (on 11).
 Valeri Tolstov - flute (on 1-7, 10-15), guitar (on 10), piano (on 10), synth (on 13), programming (on 13), samples (on 13).

References

.

Serj Tankian albums
2013 debut albums
Serjical Strike Records albums
Jazz fusion albums by American artists